The 1921–22 Austrian First Class season was the eleventh season of top-tier football in Austria. Wiener Sportclub claim their first Austrian title after winning the title by two points over second place Hakoah Vienna while FC Ostmark was relegated to the second tier.

League standings

Results

References
Austria - List of final tables (RSSSF)

Austrian Football Bundesliga seasons
Austria
1921–22 in Austrian football